Sibbaldia is a genus of flowering plants of the family Rosaceae, with a circumpolar distribution, including the high Arctic. Most of the species are found in the Himalaya. The type species is Sibbaldia procumbens. It is also in the Rosoideae subfamily.

The genus name of Sibbaldia is in honour of Robert Sibbald (1641–1722), a Scottish physician and antiquary. It was first described and published in Sp. Pl. on page 284 in 1753.

Range
Its native range is the temperate Northern Hemisphere. It is found in Europe; (within Albania, Austria, Bulgaria, Corsica, East European Russia, Faroe Islands, Finland, France, Germany, Great Britain, Greece, Greenland, Iceland, Italy, North European Russia, Norway, Poland, Spain, Svalbard, Sweden, Switzerland and Yugoslavia). 
In Asia; within Siberia (in Altai), the Russian Far East (within Amur, Kamchatka, Khabarovsk, Magadan, Primorye and Sakhalin),
central Asia (within Kazakhstan, Kyrgyzstan and Tajikistan,) the Caucasus (North Caucasus and Transcaucasus), western Asia (Afghanistan, Iran and Iraq and Turkey), China (within Manchuria, north-central, Qinghai, south-central, Tibet and Xinjiang), Mongolia,
eastern Asia (Japan, Korea and Taiwan), tropical Asia (the East Himalaya, Nepal, Pakistan and the West Himalaya).
In America; Canada; (within the provinces of Alberta, Labrador, Newfoundland, Northwest Territorie, Nunavut, Nova Scotia, Prince Edward Island, Québec, Saskatchewan, and Yukon) and America; (within the states of Alaska, Arizona, British Columbia, California, Colorado, Connecticut,  Georgia, Idaho, Illinois, Iowa, Maine, Maryland, Massachusetts, Michigan, Minnesota, Montana, Nevada, New Hampshire, New Jersey, New Mexico, New York, North Carolina, North Dakota, Ontario, Oregon, Pennsylvania, Rhode Island, Tennessee, Utah, Vermont, Virginia, Washington, West Virginia, Wisconsin and Wyoming) and also in Mexico.

Species 
Recent morphological and genetic studies have shown that Sibbaldia is polyphyletic, with some species needing synonymizing or reassignment to (or from) other genera, including Sibbaldianthe, Chamaecallis, and Potentilla. Additionally, one of the three species of Sibbaldiopsis should be renamed Sibbaldia retusa once some clarity regarding the identity of their specimens is achieved. Species currently accepted by The Plant List, with suggested reassignments are as follows: 
Sibbaldia adpressa Bunge → Sibbaldianthe adpressa (Bunge) Juz. 
Sibbaldia cuneata Schouw ex Kunze 
Sibbaldia micropetala (D.Don) Hand.-Mazz. → Potentilla micropetala D.Don
Sibbaldia olgae Juz. & Ovcz. → Sibbaldia cuneata
Sibbaldia omeiensis T.T.Yu & C.L.Li → Potentilla omeiensis (T.T.Yü and C.L.Li) Soják
Sibbaldia parviflora Willd. 
Sibbaldia pentaphylla J.Krause → Potentilla clandestina Soják
Sibbaldia perpusilloides (W.W.Sm.) Hand.-Mazz. → Chamaecallis perpusillodes (W.W.Sm.) Smedmark
Sibbaldia phanerophlebia T.T.Yu & C.L.Li → probably P. micropetala
Sibbaldia procumbens L. 
Sibbaldia purpurea Royle → Potentilla purpurea (Royle) Hook. f.
Sibbaldia sericea (Grubov) Soják ← Sibbaldianthe sericea Grubov
Sibbaldia sikkimensis (Prain) Chatterjee → Potentilla sikkimensis Prain
Sibbaldia tenuis Hand.-Mazz. → Potentilla tenuis (Hand.-Mazz.) Soják
Sibbaldia tetrandra Bunge → Potentilla tetrandra (Hook. f.) Bunge

References 

Rosaceae genera
Potentilleae
Taxa named by Carl Linnaeus
Plants described in 1753